Cryptophasa nymphidias is a moth in the family Xyloryctidae. It was described by Turner in 1926. It is found in Australia.

Adults are pure white.

References

Cryptophasa
Moths described in 1926